Ningjin County is a county in the south of Hebei province, China. Both and G20 Qingdao–Yinchuan Expressway and China National Highway 308 pass through the county.

Administrative divisions
The county administers 10 towns and 6 townships.

Climate

References

External links

County-level divisions of Hebei